White Spot / Delta Road Race is the name of two cycling races:
White Spot / Delta Road Race (men's race)
White Spot / Delta Road Race (women's race)